Georgeta Gabor (born 10 January 1962, Onesti, Bacau county) is a retired Romanian artistic gymnast who won a team silver medal at the 1976 Olympics. Her son, Andrei Antohi is a footballer.

References

1962 births
Living people
Romanian female artistic gymnasts
Gymnasts at the 1976 Summer Olympics
Olympic gymnasts of Romania
Olympic silver medalists for Romania
Olympic medalists in gymnastics
Medalists at the 1976 Summer Olympics